Simon Wakelin is a British photojournalist working in Los Angeles, California.

Wakelin's activities as a still photographer include the features The Death and Life of Bobby Z, starring Paul Walker and Laurence Fishburne and Half Past Dead 2 starring Kurupt and Bill Goldberg. He has worked on commercials and music videos alongside Ridley Scott, John Frankenheimer, Sydney Pollack, Spike Jonze and Marcus Nispel.

His work with Virgin Records, Jive Records and Columbia Records includes photography of Courtney Love, Red Hot Chili Peppers, India.Arie and Nas.  His writing has also appeared in a number of publications such as American Cinematographer, Variety and Ad Age.

Personal life
He was married to actress, model and singer Tia Carrere. Together they have a daughter, Bianca, born September 25, 2005. On April 2, 2010, Carrere filed for divorce in person at Los Angeles Superior Court. According to court documents she cited irreconcilable differences as the reason for the divorce and was asking for sole physical custody of their daughter. Their divorce was finalized in August 2010, with the two of them reportedly sharing custody of their daughter Bianca.

References

British photojournalists
British expatriates in the United States
Living people
Year of birth missing (living people)